Ctenolucius hujeta, also known as silver gar, rocket gar, hujeta gar and freshwater barracuda, is a slender, medium-sized freshwater fish found in Venezuela and Colombia, where it is known as "agujeta"; Spanish for "shoelace". 

Large specimens can reach 30 cm (12 in) in length. This carnivorous predator, fast yet timid, feeds mainly on small fish. It spends most of its time in the upper layer of the water, very near the surface, in small schools that tend to become smaller as individuals grow and separate.

References

Ctenoluciidae
Freshwater fish of Colombia
Fish of Venezuela
Magdalena River
Taxa named by Achille Valenciennes
Fish described in 1850